The 2020 CONCACAF Champions League Final was the final match of the 2020 CONCACAF Champions League, the 12th edition of the CONCACAF Champions League under its current name, and overall the 55th edition of the premier association football club competition organized by CONCACAF, the regional governing body of North America, Central America and the Caribbean.

Due to the COVID-19 pandemic, the final was switched from a two-legged series at the finalists home grounds to a single match at the predetermined neutral venue, making it the first final since the 2002 CONCACAF Champions' Cup to be contested over a single leg. The match, originally scheduled for April 28–30, 2020 for the first leg and May 5–7, 2020 for the second leg, was postponed to December 22, 2020. The match was played at Exploria Stadium in Orlando, Florida, United States, between Tigres UANL and Los Angeles FC.

UANL won their first CONCACAF Champions League title and qualified for the 2020 FIFA Club World Cup in Qatar.

Teams
In the following table, final until 2008 were in the CONCACAF Champions' Cup era, since 2009 were in the CONCACAF Champions League era.

Venue 

In October 2020, it was reported that CONCACAF would resume the tournament at a neutral location either in Mexico or in the U.S. states of California, Florida, or Texas during the third or fourth week of December over the span of the week. On November 2, 2020, CONCACAF announced that the tournament would resume at a centralized location in the United States from December 15 to 22, 2020, with the remaining quarter-finals, single-leg semi-finals and final. Exploria Stadium in Orlando, Florida, home of Major League Soccer club Orlando City SC, was designated as the host for the remainder of the tournament.

Background

The CONCACAF Champions League was established in 2008 as the continental championship for football clubs in North America, Central America, and the Caribbean, succeeding the CONCACAF Champions' Cup. During its first nine editions, the Champions League consisted of a group stage in summer and autumn followed by a knockout stage during the following spring. Beginning with the 2018 edition of the tournament, the group stage was re-formed as the CONCACAF League and limited to Central American and Caribbean teams. The Champions League was shortened to a two-month knockout tournament between teams from North American and major Central American nations, as well as the winner of the CONCACAF League. The knockout tournament falls within the beginning of Major League Soccer's season, which operates on a summer schedule unlike other football leagues.

The 2020 edition of the Champions League was greatly altered to the COVID-19 pandemic. The round of 16 began on time with series played in late February 2020. The first legs of the quarter-finals began as scheduled on March 10, with three of the four quarter-final first legs played. On March 12, 2020, CONCACAF suspended all competitions due to rising concerns around the pandemic. The tournament was indefinitely postponed with no announcements on the resumption of the tournament from CONCACAF until August 2020, with the organization stating there were plans to resume the tournament at a neutral venue at the end of the year. In November 2020 this was confirmed with the tournament resuming behind closed doors, with the semi-finals onward consisting of a single leg.

Road to the final
Note: In all results below, the score of the finalist is given first (H: Home; A: Away; N: Neutral).

''Note: Even though UANL was considered the "home" team for their second leg quarter-final match against New York City FC (with away goals applying), the match was played in Orlando behind closed doors due to the COVID-19 pandemic.

UANL

Los Angeles FC 

Los Angeles FC were making their first ever appearance in the CONCACAF Champions League Final. They were also the first MLS team since Toronto FC's 2018 Champions League run to reach the final, and the first American team to reach the final since Real Salt Lake did so in 2011. En route to the final, LAFC eliminated three Liga MX teams, the most ever by an American or MLS club. LAFC qualified for the Champions League by winning the Supporters' Shield for having the best regular season record during the 2019 Major League Soccer season, accumulating 72 points in 34 matches, the best record by a Supporters' Shield winner since their local rivals, LA Galaxy in 1998.

LAFC opened their Champions League campaign on February 18, 2020, against León at Estadio León. León bested LAFC 2–0 with goals coming from Jean Meneses and Ángel Mena in the first and second halves, respectively. LAFC hosted León on February 25, and overcame the two-goal deficit and won the match 3–0, and the series on aggregate 3–2, making the first time in the Champions League era, an American team overcame a multi-goal deficit to defeat a Mexican team.

LAFC were slated to continue the tournament by hosting Cruz Azul in the quarter-finals, with the first leg being held on March 12, 2020. The match was the last scheduled quarter-final match of the week, with the other three fixtures being played on March 10 and 11. However, with rising concerns surrounding the COVID-19 pandemic in North America, CONCACAF postponed the match, and the entire tournament.

Format
The final was played in a single match at a neutral venue, instead of the typical home-and-away two-legged series. If the match was tied after regulation, extra time was played. If the score was still tied after extra time, a penalty shoot-out was used to determine the winner.

Match

Details

Statistics

Post-match 
As winners of the Champions League, UANL qualified for the 2020 FIFA Club World Cup in Qatar, which was held in February 2021 due to the COVID-19 pandemic. They beat Asian champions Ulsan Hyundai of South Korea, and South American champions Palmeiras of Brazil, becoming the first ever CONCACAF team to reach the final; they would lose the decisive match to European champions Bayern Munich of Germany.

See also
2020 CONCACAF League Final

Notes

References

External links
CONCACAF Champions League

2020
Final
December 2020 sports events in the United States
2020 in sports in Florida
International club association football competitions hosted by the United States
Los Angeles FC matches
Tigres UANL matches
2019–20 in Mexican football
2020 in American soccer
Soccer in Florida
Association football events postponed due to the COVID-19 pandemic